Fabian Gerster (born December 29, 1986) is a German footballer who plays for Stuttgarter Kickers.

External links

1986 births
Living people
German footballers
People from Bad Saulgau
Sportspeople from Tübingen (region)
SC Pfullendorf players
Stuttgarter Kickers players
3. Liga players
Association football fullbacks
Footballers from Baden-Württemberg